Ryuji Sugimoto (杉本 竜士, born 1 June 1993) is a Japanese football player for Tokyo Verdy.

Career statistics

Club
.

References

External links
Profile at Nagoya Grampus

1993 births
Living people
Association football people from Tokyo Metropolis
People from Fuchū, Tokyo
Japanese footballers
J1 League players
J2 League players
Japan Football League players
Tokyo Verdy players
FC Machida Zelvia players
Nagoya Grampus players
Tokushima Vortis players
Yokohama F. Marinos players
Yokohama FC players
Association football forwards